La Femme (simplified Chinese: 绝对佳人; previously known as 女人当自强) is a Singaporean Chinese modern family drama mainly emphasizing on the lives of three women of different traits. It was telecasted on Singapore's free-to-air channel, MediaCorp Channel 8. It made its debut on 2 June 2008 and ended on 4 July 2008. This drama serial consists of 25 episodes, and was aired on every weekday night at 9:00 pm.

Cast

Main cast

Supporting Cast

2009 Accolades

The series was nominated for 2 categories.

Star Awards 2009

External links
Official Website

Singapore Chinese dramas
2008 Singaporean television series debuts
Channel 8 (Singapore) original programming